Angoon (sometimes formerly spelled Angun) is a city on Admiralty Island in Hoonah-Angoon Census Area, Alaska, United States. At the 2000 census the population was 572; by the 2010 census the population had declined to 459. The name in Tlingit, means roughly "isthmus town."

History
Admiralty Island has long been the home of the Kootznoowoo Tlingit group, or Xootsnoowú Ḵwáan in Tlingit. Kootznoowoo means "fortress of brown bears", literally xoots-noow-ú "brown.bear-fortress-possessive". Angoon has a less-rainy climate than most of southeastern Alaska and was valued by the Tlingit for that reason.

During the Russian period in Alaska, from the 18th century to the mid-19th century, maritime fur trading was a major economic activity in the area.

In 1878, after the 1867 Alaska Purchase, the North West Trading Company established a trading post and whaling station on nearby Killisnoo Island and employed Angoon villagers to hunt whales. Whaling, a school, and a Russian Orthodox church attracted many Tlingits to neighboring Killisnoo.

In October 1882 of the village was destroyed in the Angoon Bombardment by US Naval forces under the command Commander Edgar C. Merriman and the USRC Thomas Corwin under the command of Michael A. Healy. The Tlingit villagers had taken white hostages and property and demanded two hundred blankets in compensation from the North West Trading Company following the accidental death of a Tlingit shaman who died in a whaling bomb accident while working on the whaler. The hostages were released upon the arrival of the naval expedition to Angoon, however Merriman demanded four hundred blankets in tribute and upon the Tlingit delivery of just eighty one blankets, Merriman's forces destroyed the village.

After a short time, the North West Trading Company switched to herring processing. During this time, many Tlingits moved to Killisnoo for employment at the fish plant. In 1928, Killisnoo was destroyed by fire and many Tlingits returned to Angoon.

In 1973, Angoon won a U.S. $90,000 settlement from the United States government for the 1882 bombardment.

Geography
Angoon is located on the west side of Admiralty Island at  (57.496891, -134.573579). It is the largest permanent settlement on Admiralty Island and is sited on an isthmus at the mouth of Kootznahoo Inlet on the west side of the island. The only other community on the island is Cube Cove, to the north.

Climate
The climate is either an Oceanic climate (Köppen climate classification: Cfb), when utilising the -3 °C isotherm or a warm-summer Humid continental climate  (Köppen climate classification: Dfb), when utili the 0 °C isotherm. Its climate moderately tempered by a hot current is only slightly more extreme than the north of Scotland.

Demographics

Angoon first appeared on the 1880 U.S. Census as the native village of "Augoon" with 420 residents, all members of the Tlingit tribe. The area returned as "Hoochinoo" (AKA Kootznahoo) in 1890. Angoon did not appear again on the census until 1920. It has appeared on every successive census to date as of 2010, and incorporated as a city in 1963.

As of the census of 2000, there were 572 people, 184 households, and 138 families residing in the city.  The population density was 25.4 people per square mile (9.8/km).  There were 221 housing units at an average density of 9.8 per square mile (3.8/km).  The racial makeup of the city was 81.99% Native American, 11.36% White, 5.42% of the population were Hispanic or Latino of any race, 0.52% Black or African American, 0.17% Asian, 1.40% from other races, and 4.55% from two or more races.

Of the 184 households, 42.4% had children under the age of 18 living with them, 49.5% were married couples living together, 17.4% had a female householder with no husband present, and 25.0% were non-families. 22.3% of all households were made up of individuals, and 2.7% had someone living alone who was 65 years of age or older.  The average household size was 3.11 and the average family size was 3.64.

In the city, the age distribution of the population shows 34.8% under the age of 18, 8.6% from 18 to 24, 28.3% from 25 to 44, 21.9% from 45 to 64, and 6.5% who were 65 years of age or older.  The median age was 32 years. For every 100 females, there were 110.3 males.  For every 100 females age 18 and over, there were 115.6 males.

The median income for a household in the city was $29,861, and the median income for a family was $31,429. Males had a median income of $21,250 versus $30,625 for females. The per capita income for the city was $11,357.  About 27.0% of families and 27.9% of the population were below the poverty line, including 39.1% of those under age 18 and 20.0% of those age 65 or over.

Government
Angoon is a second-class city, and uses a Mayor-Council form of government.

Economy
Fishing and fish processing are the mainstays of the economy at Angoon now.

Angoon is looking into non-diesel electric power generation to reduce local electric bills.

Angoon was listed by Sunset magazine as one of the "Top 100 Best Honeymoon Spots" in July 2009.

Education
Chatham School District operates two schools:
Angoon Elementary School
Angoon High School

References

Further reading
 Garfield, Viola (1947) "Historical Aspects of Tlingit Clans in Angoon, Alaska."  American Anthropologist, vol. 49, no. 3, pp. 438–452.
 Jacobs, Harold (2000) "Xoodzidaa Kwáan: Inhabitants of the Burning Wood Fort."  In: Will the Time Ever Come? A Tlingit Source Book, ed. by Andrew Hope III and Thomas F. Thornton, pp. 34–47.  Fairbanks, Alaska: Alaska Native Knowledge Network.
 South East Alaska with Pack & Paddle, by Margaret Piggott

External links

 Angoon at the Community Database Online from the Alaska Division of Community and Regional Affairs
 Maps from the Alaska Department of Labor and Workforce Development: 2000, 2010
 Juneau Empire story and transcription of 1882 letter critical of Angoon shelling; only unofficial contemporary source
 Naval Historical Center. Shelling of the Alaskan native American village of Angoon, October, 1882 Original reports from M.A. Healy, E.C. Merriman, W.G. Morris, and supporting documents, in PDF form.

Cities in Alaska
Cities in Hoonah–Angoon Census Area, Alaska
Cities in Unorganized Borough, Alaska
Populated coastal places in Alaska on the Pacific Ocean
Pre-statehood history of Alaska